Lagusa or Lagousa or Lagussa or Lagoussa (Λαγοῦσσα) may refer to:

 Kardiotissa, an island in the Aegean Sea belonging to Greece
 Kızılada, Fethiye, an island in the Mediterranean Sea belonging to Turkey

Ancient Greek geography